The Montschenloch is a mountain, and the sixth highest in the Swabian Jura in southern Germany. It lies about a kilometre east of Deilingen, forming a chain of mountains with the Rainen, Bol and Wandbühl. The Montschenloch belongs to the Region of the 10 Thousanders.

References 

One-thousanders of Germany
Mountains and hills of Baden-Württemberg
Mountains and hills of the Swabian Jura
Tuttlingen (district)